Más de Mi Alma (English: More of My Soul) is the fourth studio album recorded by Mexican singer-songwriter Marco Antonio Solís. It was released by Fonovisa on May 29, 2001 (see 2001 in music). This album became his second number-one hit on the Billboard Top Latin Albums chart and received a nomination for Latin Grammy Award for Best Pop Vocal Album, Male at the 3rd Annual Latin Grammy Awards in 2002. "Cuando Te Acuerdes de Mi" was featured in the telenovela Salomé, produced by Juan Osorio. The album received a 2002 Premio Lo Nuestro Award nomination for Pop Album of the Year.

Track listing 

All songs written and composed by Marco Antonio Solís

Credits 
This information from Allmusic.
 Bebu Silvetti: Synthesizer, piano, producer, music direction
 Sylvia Silvetti: Coordination
 Benny Faccone: Engineer
 Alfredo Matheus: Engineer, mixing
 Steve Orchard: Engineer
 Tony Rambo: Engineer
 Boris Milan: Editing
 Richard Bravo: percussion
 Julio Hernández: Banjo
 Orlando Hernández: drums
 Manny López: Guitar, mandolin
 Johnathan Rees: Concertina
 Bárbara Larrinaga: vocals
 John Coulter: Graphic design
 Dorothy Low: Photography

Chart performance

Sales and certifications

See also
 List of best-selling Latin albums

References 

2001 albums
Marco Antonio Solís albums
Fonovisa Records albums